Ryota Yamamoto (born 13 May 1997) is a Japanese nordic combined skier who competed at the 2022 Winter Olympics.

References

External links

Living people
1997 births
Japanese male Nordic combined skiers
Sportspeople from Nagano Prefecture
Nordic combined skiers at the 2022 Winter Olympics
Olympic Nordic combined skiers of Japan
Olympic bronze medalists for Japan
Olympic medalists in Nordic combined
Medalists at the 2022 Winter Olympics